Tobacco Free Florida is an anti-smoking organization based in the U.S. state of Florida, administered by the Florida Department of Health.

Mission 
Since the Tobacco Free Florida Campaign was founded in February 2008, the four main programmatic goals have been:
 Promote cessation of tobacco use
 Prevent the initiation of tobacco use among all ages 
 Eliminate secondhand smoke exposure
 Reduce tobacco-related health problems

History 
Since 1989, Florida's Department of Health and Rehabilitative Services has been actively involved in the prevention of tobacco use. In 1997, Florida settled a lawsuit with a large tobacco industry and was granted $11.3 billion to assist with Medicaid costs for smokers, incurred by various health providers. As a result of the lawsuit, the Tobacco Pilot Program was launched by the Florida Department of Health to help educate youth on the harmful impacts of tobacco use.  When Florida's legislation decided to reduce funding to $1 million annually five years later after the Tobacco Pilot Program was launched, Floridians passed a constitutional amendment in 2006, which requires an annual appropriation of 15% of the gross 2005 tobacco settlement fund (adjusted for inflation) to provide money for a statewide tobacco education and prevention program.

In 2007, the Zimmerman Agency was granted a $17.1 million contract to conduct a statewide social marketing, media, and public relations campaign. The Tobacco Free Florida brand was created as the department's health communication intervention component. The Tobacco Free Florida Campaign helps thousands of Floridians quit using smoke and smokeless tobacco products through the use of TV, radio, print and social media advertising. The organization operates on a budget of about $65 million per year.

Campaign overview 
The campaign started in 2008 was created to discourage the use of tobacco among all Floridians but with a specific emphasis on youth ages 11–17, adults ages 18–24, people living with chronic diseases, pregnant women, parents, and people in low-income households. The campaign uses various communication channels, including English, Spanish, and Haitian Creole media, to target all audiences. The Tobacco Free Florida and Quitline commercials have become widely known through the years of their existence. Tobacco Free Florida states that they intend to create "messages that elicit strong emotional responses, such as personal testimonials and strong viscerally negative content."  For example, a commercial showed a brain cut in half to show the clot that has formed due to cigarette smoke. Billboards and posters are used to display images of unhealthy lungs, millions of cigarette buds collected, and alarming statistics regarding tobacco use.

Along with radio, commercial and social media, Tobacco Free Florida has several groundwork initiatives, including Smokifier Vans that travel the state visiting festivals, sporting events, and co-branded partners (YMCA and Walmart). The vans have age-progression software photo booths that ages visitors as smokers and nonsmokers allowing Floridians to experience the physical effects of smoking.

Sports partnerships 
Tobacco Free Florida has established partnerships with all of the following sports organizations:
 Tampa Bay Rays
 Tampa Bay Lightning
 Florida Panthers
 Miami Heat
 Orlando Magic
 Miami Dolphins
 Florida State University
 University of Florida
 Bethune Cookman University
 University of South Florida
 University of Central Florida

Super Bowl ads 
In 2010, Tobacco Free Florida purchased a package of ads for $447,992.51 to be run multiple times before, during, and after the National Football League Super Bowl championship game. The ads were created with a smoking cessation message intended to target adult smokers.  A focus group was run on people who had seen the commercials and concluded that people did not care that they were at an increased risk of dying from cancer or heart disease, but they did care that every year smoking leaves 31,000 children fatherless. The overall impact of the advertisement campaign was to target adult smokers to think about their tobacco use affecting their children and family.

References

External links 
 

Health in Florida
Tobacco control
Smoking in the United States